is a Japanese manga artist from Shiga Prefecture, Japan. He is notable as the illustrator of one of the Higurashi When They Cry manga adaptations: Himatsubushi-hen, or Time Killing Arc. He is also the artist and writer of Doubt, which was completed in February 2009. He followed up the Doubt series with two spiritual sequels, Judge and Secret, all connected by the recurring appearance of the iconic Rabbit mask from Doubt. Doubt has been published in the US by Yen Press in its entirety in 2 volumes in April and July 2013, and the entire six-book series of Judge and the three-book series of Secret have been published by them as well. They have also been published in various countries in Europe.

Tonogai is a former assistant of Atsushi Ōkubo, and he has left a message commemorating the Soul Eater anime adaptation in the Spring 2008 issue of Fresh Gangan.

Works

References

External links
  
 
 Pixiv account
 
 Yoshiki Tonogai's Biography in Lambiek Comiclopedia

Manga artists from Shiga Prefecture
Year of birth missing (living people)
Living people